Cliffard Dale Carlson (December 30, 1915 – August 28, 1977) was a U.S. Representative from Illinois. Carlson was born and raised in Aurora, Illinois, and attended North Central College and received his B.A. from the University of New Mexico in 1939. After serving in the United States Naval Reserve, he entered business as a manufacturer. Carlson served as a delegate to the Republican National Conventions in 1960, 1964, and 1968, and was an Illinois Republican Central Committeeman.

In 1972, Carlson won a special election to fill the vacancy caused by the resignation of Charlotte Thompson Reid, and did not seek re-election. He took his seat on April 4, 1972, and served until January 3, 1973. He lost an election to rejoin the House in 1974.

Carlson died in Dixon, Illinois on August 28, 1977, and is interred at Oak Hill Cemetery in Geneva, Illinois.

External links

 

1915 births
1977 deaths
Republican Party members of the United States House of Representatives from Illinois
20th-century American politicians